Hovhannes Harutyunyan (born 25 May 1999) is an Armenian professional footballer who plays as a midfielder for Armenian Premier League club Pyunik and Armenian national U21 team.

Career

Club
On 1 March 2018, Zemplín Michalovce announced the signing of Harutyunyan to a two-year contract. Harutyunyan made his professional debut for Zemplín Michalovce against Senica on April 28, 2018.

On 28 January 2021, Harutyunyan was released by Ararat-Armenia, with Pyunik announcing his signing on  4 February 2021. On 3 February 2023, Harutyunyan extended his contract with Pyunik, until the summer of 2024.

Career statistics

Club

Honours
Ararat-Armenia
Armenian Premier League (1): 2019–20
Armenian Supercup (1): 2019

Pyunik
Armenian Premier League (1): 2021–22

References

External links

Futbalnet profile

1999 births
Living people
Armenian footballers
Association football midfielders
Armenia youth international footballers
Armenian expatriate footballers
FC Pyunik players
FC Ararat-Armenia players
MFK Zemplín Michalovce players
Slovak Super Liga players
Armenian Premier League players
Expatriate footballers in Slovakia
Armenian expatriate sportspeople in Slovakia
Armenia under-21 international footballers